Heavens is the debut studio album from Boston indie rock band Big Dipper. The album was released in 1987 by Homestead Records. Heavens was remastered and re-released in 2008 as part of Merge Records' Supercluster: The Big Dipper Anthology set. The song "Mr. Woods" was covered by Gigolo Aunts on Safe and Sound: A Benefit in Response to the Brookline Clinic Violence, released in 1996 on Mercury Records.

Track listing

1987 albums
Big Dipper (band) albums
Homestead Records albums
Albums produced by Paul Q. Kolderie